This is a list of German television related events from 1997.

Events
15 February - Tammy Eckhardt, performing as Alanis Morissette wins the second and final season of Soundmix Show.
27 February - Bianca Shomburg is selected to represent Germany at the 1997 Eurovision Song Contest with her song "Zeit". She is selected to be the forty-second German Eurovision entry during Der Countdown läuft held at the Musik-und-Kongresshalle in Lübeck.

Debuts

International
20 January -  L.A. Heat (1999) (RTL II)
4 February - / The Magical Adventures of Quasimodo (1996) (KiKA)
17 March - // Billy the Cat (1996–2001) (ZDF)
5 April -  Little Bear (1995–2003) (ZDF)
4 October - / Tabaluga (1994–2004) (ZDF)
17 October - // Magic Adventures of Mumfie (1994–1999) (Kinderkanal)
/ Potsworth & Co (1990) (RTL II)

BFBS
7 June - / The Magical Adventures of Quasimodo (1996)
10 June - // Gadget Boy & Heather (1995–1998)
11 June - / Arthur (1996–present)
6 September -  Plasmo (1997)
26 November -  Enid Blyton's Enchanted Lands (1997–1998)
1 December - // The Adventures of Paddington Bear (1997–2000)
 The Prince of Atlantis (1997)
 Sooty's Amazing Adventures (1997–1998)
 The Wild House (1997–1999)
 Zot the Dog (1996–1997)
 Teletubbies (1997-2001, 2015–present)
 Dr. Xargle (1997–1998)

Changes of network affiliation

Military broadcasting

Television shows

1950s
Tagesschau (1952–present)

1960s
 heute (1963-present)

1970s
 heute-journal (1978-present)
 Tagesthemen (1978-present)

1980s
Wetten, dass..? (1981-2014)
Lindenstraße (1985–present)

1990s
Gute Zeiten, schlechte Zeiten (1992–present)
Marienhof (1992–2011)
Unter uns (1994-present)
Verbotene Liebe (1995-2015)

Ending this year
Gottschalks Hausparty (1995-1997)
Soundmix Show (1995-1997)

Births

Deaths

See also 
1997 in Germany